Meroy (Astur-Leonese: Meirói) is a locality located in the municipality of Cabrillanes, in León province, Castile and León, Spain. As of 2020, it has a population of 20.

Geography 
Meroy is located 93km northwest of León, Spain.

References

Populated places in the Province of León